The Eisner Award for Best Painter/Digital Artist is an award for creative achievement in American comic books. It is awarded to a comic book artist for interior art.

Name change
The award was named "Best Painter" from 1993 to 1999, "Best Painter/Multimedia Artist" from 2000 to 2019, and "Best Painter/Digital Artist" from 2020 to present. The term "(interior art)" has been inconsistently added to the end of the award's name.

Winners and nominees

Multiple awards and nominations

The following individuals have won Best Painter/Digital Artist one or more times:

The following individuals have received two or more nominations but never won Best Painter/Digital Artist:

See also
 Eisner Award for Best Publication for Early Readers
 Eisner Award for Best Academic/Scholarly Work
 Eisner Award for Best Cover Artist
 Eisner Award for Best Coloring
 Eisner Award for Best Lettering
 Eisner Award for Best Writer

References

Painter/Digital Artist
1993 establishments in the United States
Annual events in the United States
Awards established in 1993